The Curse of the Pharaohs is a historical mystery novel by Elizabeth Peters, the second in the Amelia Peabody series of novels; it takes place in the excavation season of 1892–93.

Plot summary

The Emersons are at home in England, aching to return to Egypt, but finding no excuse to return until Lady Baskerville asks them to finish the excavation started by her husband, who died mysteriously just before opening a tomb in Luxor. No one else will continue as rumors of a curse on those who desecrate the tomb fly through the region.

Leaving their son Ramses at home, the Emersons arrive at the Baskerville compound near the Valley of the Kings to find sick employees, over-eager reporters, and an assortment of other characters trying to either get into the tomb, or keep the Emersons out.

Three recurring characters are introduced; Cyrus Vandergelt, Karl von Bork and Kevin O'Connell. Vandergelt is a wealthy amateur American Egyptologist, and over the years becomes Professor Emerson's closest friend. Bork is an expert in hieroglyphs who appears in a number of stories, usually assisting other Egyptologists. O'Connell is a reporter who eventually becomes a valuable outlet for the Emersons and their adventures.

See also

List of characters in the Amelia Peabody series

1981 novels
Amelia Peabody
Novels set in Egypt
Historical mystery novels
Fiction set in 1892
Fiction set in 1893
Novels set in the 1890s
Dodd, Mead & Co. books